Synemon wulwulam is a moth in the Castniidae family. It is found in Australia, including Western Australia, Northern Territory and Queensland.

Adults have pale brown forewings with a dark brown base, margin and cell on top, and orange and brown underneath. The hindwings are dark brown, often with a marginal arc of orange spots on top, but plain brown underneath.

The larvae probably feed on the roots of Chrysopogon fallax.

References

Moths described in 1951
Castniidae